Solomonson Izuchukwuka (born 23 December 1988) is a Nigerian footballer who currently plays as a forward for Bylis in the Albanian Superliga.

References

1988 births
Living people
Nigerian footballers
Kategoria Superiore players
Nigerian expatriate footballers
Nigerian expatriate sportspeople in Albania
Expatriate footballers in Albania
FK Kukësi players
Association football forwards
KF Bylis Ballsh players